The political positions of Kamala Harris are reflected by her United States Senate voting record, public speeches, and interviews. Kamala Harris served as the junior senator from California from 2017 to 2021. On August 11, 2020, Harris was selected by presumptive Democratic presidential nominee Joe Biden to be his running mate in the 2020 United States presidential election, running against incumbent U.S. President Donald Trump and Vice President Mike Pence. With Biden's election victory, Harris was subsequently elected as vice president. Harris was described by The New York Times as a pragmatic moderate, with policy positions that broadly mirror those of Biden. However, the non-partisan GovTrack rated Harris as the most liberal U.S. Senator, prompting debate over her position in center-left and left-wing politics. Despite this, left-wing activists have criticised Harris on numerous occasions for her past actions as prosecutors, which have been called “right-wing”.

Lifetime ratings

Social issues

Abortion

In 2013, when she was California Attorney General, Harris allowed the Hoag Memorial Hospital Presbyterian to cease the availability of elective abortions, after it entered a partnership with a Catholic chain, St. Joseph Health System. The ban was made due to St. Joseph's "sensitivity" about abortion. As the attorney general, Harris had legal authority to decide on any such change, as a condition of her approving a major transaction involving any non-profit medical institution in the state. The ban would not be able to go into effect without her knowledge or approval. Harris did set conditions on the ban, requiring the hospital to "take steps to ensure that alternative providers are available and accessible to all women, especially low-income women for direct abortions" in the hospital's serviceable area.

Critics voiced concern that by imposing Catholic doctrine on its operations, St. Joseph was reducing the availability of reproductive services while receiving millions of dollars from taxpayers through Medicare and Medicaid reimbursements and a legal status that allowed it to be tax-exempt while taking tax deductions.

In July 2015, an organization called "The Center for Medical Progress" (dba "Biomax"), a registered California non-profit corporation, posted five videos, shot in Texas, as evidence that Planned Parenthood was "illegally trafficking aborted fetal parts". The videos were found to be manipulatedpropaganda produced by anti-abortion activists who used fake California identification to establish a ghost California non-profit corporation. Within two months of the videos' posting, a Texas grand jury indicted the two activists responsible for producing them. However, as of March 2016, Harris had yet to make any determination on the matter: "In July, our politically ambitious attorney general, Kamala Harris, vowed to 'carefully review' the 'Center for Medical Progress… what is [she] waiting for?"

While a spokesperson for Harris said that "the office does not comment on investigations, or even confirm whether an investigation exists", abortion rights advocates began to speculate that Harris's senatorial campaign to replace Barbara Boxer might have contributed to Harris's "lack of urgency" on the case.

However, in September 2016, Governor Jerry Brown signed into law "Assembly Bill 1671", which was reportedly drafted by Harris, with input from Planned Parenthood—which sponsored the bill—making it a criminal offense to intentionally distribute, or to help with the dissemination of, unlawfully obtained confidential communications. Libertarians, film-makers, and news organizations vehemently opposed the bill, which was signed into law after late amendments were added to it.

Since her election to the Senate, Harris has maintained a 100% rating by the abortion rights advocacy group Planned Parenthood Action Fund, and a 0% rating by the anti-abortion group National Right to Life Committee. She was also endorsed by Emily's List in 2015 during her senatorial campaign.

Affirmative action

Harris opposed California's ban on affirmative action. She asked the Supreme Court to "re-affirm its decision that public colleges and universities may consider race as one factor in admissions decisions". Harris filed legal papers in the Supreme Court case supporting race as an admissions factor at the University of Texas. She also filed papers supporting affirmative action in a different Supreme Court case involving the University of Michigan.

Capital punishment
Harris is opposed to the death penalty, but has said that she would review each case individually. Harris also received criticism in the past for denying DNA tests to a convict who was found to be innocent in 2009. Robert Dunham, executive director of the Death Penalty Information Center, called her positions “a mixed record”.

As the district attorney of San Francisco, Harris was opposed to the death penalty, refusing to demand it against a man charged with the murder of a police officer. This decision was controversial and criticized by Senator Dianne Feinstein. She reversed her position as the California attorney general, when she defended the death penalty in that state against a federal ruling which might have resulted in its abolition and declined to support two ballot initiatives that would have banned the death penalty in the state, raising accusations of political opportunism and inconsistency on the issue.
However, in July 2019, as Attorney General William Barr announced the federal government's resumption of capital punishment after nearly 20 years without an execution of a federal inmate. Harris criticized the move as "misguided", "immoral", and "a gross misuse of taxpayer dollars". As a senator, she also co-sponsored a bill banning the death penalty.

Criminal justice 
In December 2018, Harris voted for the First Step Act, legislation aimed at reducing recidivism rates among federal prisoners through expanding job training and other programs, in addition to forming an expansion of early release programs and modifications on sentencing laws such as mandatory minimum sentences for non-violent drug offenders, "to more equitably punish drug offenders".

In March 2020, Harris was one of fifteen senators to sign a letter to Federal Bureau of Prisons, GEO Group, CoreCivic, and Management and Training Corporation requesting information on their strategy to address the COVID-19 pandemic, asserting that it was "critical that [you] have a plan to help prevent the spread of the novel coronavirus to incarcerated individuals and correctional staff, along with their families and loved ones, and provide treatment to incarcerated individuals and staff who become infected".

In June 2020, following a campaign by a coalition of community groups, including Black Lives Matter, Los Angeles Mayor Eric Garcetti announced Los Angeles Police Department budget cuts of $150 million. Kamala Harris supported Garcetti's decision to cut the LAPD's budget by $150 million.

Harris’ criminal justice record has been seen as mixed, with many critics of Harris calling her “tough on crime” despite her claim of being a self-described “progressive prosecutor”, citing her reluctance in releasing prisoners and her anti-truancy policies. Harris has also criticised liberals for what she called “biases against law enforcement” in her 2009 book.

Drugs 
Harris did not initially support the legalization of recreational marijuana, but later moved to support legalization. In 2010, while campaigning for Attorney General of California, she opposed Proposition 19, the first failed attempt to legalize recreational marijuana in California, arguing that selling drugs harms communities. In 2015, she called for an end on the federal prohibition of medical marijuana.

In April 2018, following reports that the Justice Department was blocking the Drug Enforcement Administration from taking action on over two dozen requests to grow marijuana for use in research, Harris and Republican Orrin Hatch sent a letter to Attorney General Jeff Sessions on the necessity of marijuana research "for evidence-based decision making" and "to resolve critical questions of public health and safety, such as learning the impacts of marijuana on developing brains and formulating methods to test marijuana impairment in drivers."

In May 2018, Harris announced she would co-sponsor the Marijuana Justice Act (originally introduced by Senator Cory Booker in August 2017) which would legalize cannabis at the federal level by removing it from the Controlled Substance Act. The bill would also require federal courts to automatically expunge earlier federal marijuana convictions related to use or possession and would penalize states that enforce cannabis laws in a disproportionate manner against minority or low-income individuals. In February 2019, as she re-introduced the Marijuana Justice Act, Harris asserted that the United States had not equally applied marijuana laws and "criminalized marijuana use in a way that has led to the disproportionate incarceration of young men of color."

In December 2018, Harris was one of 21 senators to sign a letter to Commissioner of Food and Drugs Scott Gottlieb stating their approval of the actions of the Food and Drugs Administration (FDA) to hinder youth access to e-cigarettes and urging the FDA "to take additional, stronger steps to prevent and reduce e-cigarette use among youth."

In July 2019, Harris and Representative Jerry Nadler introduced the Marijuana Opportunity Reinvestment and Expungement (MORE) Act of 2019, legislation that would legalize marijuana on the federal level in addition to expunging low-level marijuana possession convictions and authorizing grants to members of communities of color as part of an effort to reverse decades of damage cannabis criminalization had inflicted to those respective communities. In a statement, Harris cited the need to regulate marijuana and ensuring "everyone—especially communities of color that have been disproportionately impacted by the War on Drugs—has a real opportunity to participate in this growing industry."

Education
Harris has argued for treating "habitual and chronic truancy" among children in elementary school as a crime committed by the parents of truant children. She argues that there is a direct connection between habitual truancy in elementary school and crime later in life. She has received the endorsement of the California Federation of Teachers.

Harris supports busing for desegregation of public schools, saying that "the schools of America are as segregated, if not more segregated, today than when I was in elementary school". Harris views busing as an option to be considered by school districts, rather than the responsibility of the federal government.

Harris supports the creation of a government funding program to pay tuition and fees for students attending public colleges and universities for dependent students whose parents have income of $125,000 or less and independent students with incomes of $125,000 or less. The program would be funded by a fee on Wall Street firms of 0.5 percent per stock trade. Regarding student loans, Harris proposed having up to $20,000 in student debt forgiven for Pell Grant recipients who start a business and operate it for at least three years in a disadvantaged community. Eligible students would also have loans deferred interest free for a business formation period of up to three years.

Election security 
On December 21, 2017, Harris was one of six senators to introduce the "Secure Elections Act", legislation authorizing block grants for states that would update outdated voting technology. The act would also create a program for an independent panel of experts to develop cybersecurity guidelines for election systems that states could adopt if they choose, along with offering states resources to implement the recommendations.

In March 2019, Harris told Jimmy Kimmel that she was open to discussing abolishing the Electoral College given that there was "no question that the popular vote has been diminished in terms of making the final decision about who's the president of the United States and we need to deal with that".

In May 2019, Harris was a co-sponsor of the Protecting American Votes and Elections (PAVE) Act, legislation granting the United States Department of Homeland Security the authority "to set minimum cybersecurity standards for U.S. voting machines, authorize a one-time $500 million grant program for states to buy ballot-scanning machines to count paper ballots, and require states to conduct risk-limiting audits of all federal elections in order to detect any cyber hacks".

Guns
Harris earned an "F" rating from the National Rifle Association for her consistent efforts supporting gun control.
While serving as district attorney in San Francisco Harris, along with other district attorneys, filed an amicus brief in District of Columbia v. Heller arguing that the Washington, D.C. gun law at issue did not violate the Second Amendment.

During her run for Senate, Harris was endorsed by former U.S. Representative Gabby Giffords, who had been shot in Tucson in 2011. She was also endorsed by the Brady Campaign to Prevent Gun Violence.

In response to the 2017 Las Vegas shooting, Harris supported the call for more gun control. Saying that she believed that thoughts and prayers are inadequate answers to the shooting, she stated that "...we must also commit ourselves to action. Another moment of silence won't suffice."

In November 2017, Harris was a co-sponsor of the Military Domestic Violence Reporting Enhancement Act, a bill that would form a charge of Domestic Violence under the Uniform Code of Military Justice (UCMJ) and stipulate that convictions would have to be reported to federal databases with the authority to keep abusers from purchasing firearms within three days in an attempt to close a loophole in the Uniform Code of Military Justice (UCMJ) through which convicted abusers retained the ability to purchase firearms.

In January 2019, Harris joined Bernie Sanders and 38 other Senate Democrats in introducing the Background Check Expansion Act, a bill that would require background checks for either the sale or transfer of all firearms including all unlicensed sellers. Exceptions to the bill's background check requirement included transfers between members of law enforcement, loaning firearms for either hunting or sporting events on a temporary basis, providing firearms as gifts to members of one's immediate family, firearms being transferred as part of an inheritance, or giving a firearm to another person temporarily for immediate self-defense.

In May 2019, Harris was one of ten Democratic senators to sign a letter to Facebook chairman and CEO Mark Zuckerberg on social media users being "able to facilitate firearm transactions by directing potential buyers to other methods of communication" despite Instagram banning gun sales on its platforms and demanded answers on how Facebook governs its own ban on gun sales and holds violators of the site's policy accountable.

Speaking to Wolf Blitzer in August 2019, Harris stated that congressional action on gun control rested in the hands of Senate Majority Leader Mitch McConnell and that she "would hope and pray that he understands that he actually has the power to do the right thing here and that he will do the right thing."

During a 2019 appearance on The Tonight Show Starring Jimmy Fallon, Harris explained her support for a mandatory buyback on assault weapons. “I do believe that we need to do buybacks, and I’ll tell you why... First of all, let’s be clear about what assault weapons are. They have been designed to kill a lot of human beings quickly. They are weapons of war with no place on the streets of a civil society." CNN reported in May 2019 that "Harris' new proposal "would ban AR-15-style assault weapon imports".

On August 14, 2019, Harris unveiled a plan that would address domestic terrorism while prioritizing increasing the difficulty for suspected individuals to either obtain or keep firearms through the formation of domestic terrorism prevention orders meant to empower law enforcement officers and family members with the ability to petition federal court for a temporary restriction on a person's access to firearms in the event that they "exhibit clear evidence of dangerousness." Harris stated that in the US "loaded guns should not be a few clicks away for any domestic terrorist with a laptop or smartphone" and cited the "need to take action to keep guns out of the hands of dangerous people and stop violent, hate-fueled attacks before they happen."

Immigration 

Harris has expressed support for San Francisco's sanctuary city policy of not inquiring about immigration status in the process of a criminal investigation. She argued that it is important that immigrants be able to talk with law enforcement without fear.

On October 25, 2017, Harris stated she would not support a spending bill until Congress addressed the Deferred Action for Childhood Arrivals (DACA) program in a way that clarified "what we are going to do to protect and take care of our DACA young people in this country." She did not support a February 2018 proposal by some Democrats to provide Trump with $25 billion in funding for a border wall, in exchange for giving Dreamers a pathway to citizenship.

In a January 2018 interview, when asked about her ideal version of a bi-partisan deal on the Deferred Action for Childhood Arrivals program, Harris stated the need to focus on comprehensive immigration reform and "pass a clean DREAM Act".

In January 2018, Harris and three other Democratic senators were co-sponsors of the Border and Port Security Act, legislation that would mandate U.S. Customs and Border Protection "hire, train, and assign at least 500 officers per year until the number of needed positions the model identifies is filled" in addition to requiring the commissioner of the Customs and Border Protection to determine potential equipment and infrastructure improvements that could be used for ports of entry.

In April 2018, Harris was one of five senators to send a letter to Thomas Homan, acting director of Immigration and Customs Enforcement (ICE), on standards used by the agency when determining how to detain a pregnant woman, requesting that pregnant women not be held in custody unless under extraordinary standards after reports "that ICE has failed to provide critical medical care to pregnant women in immigration detentionresulting in miscarriages and other negative health outcomes".

In July 2018, the Trump administration falsely accused Harris of "supporting the animals of MS-13". She responded, "As a career prosecutor, I actually went after gangs and transnational criminal organizations. That's being a leader on public safety. What is not, is ripping babies from their mothers."

In July 2018, Harris was one of 22 senators to sponsor the Stop Shackling and Detaining Pregnant Women Act, which, if enacted, would prohibit immigration officers from detaining pregnant women in a majority of circumstances, and improve conditions of care for individuals in custody.

In August 2018, Harris led 15 Democrats and Bernie Sanders in a letter to United States Secretary of Homeland Security Kirstjen Nielsen demanding that the Trump administration take immediate action in attempting to re-unite 539 migrant children with their families, citing each passing day of inaction as intensifying "trauma that this administration has needlessly caused for children and their families seeking humanitarian protection".

In November 2018, Harris was one of 11 senators to sign a letter to United States Secretary of Defense James Mattis concerning "the overt politicization of the military" with the Trump administration's deployment of 5,800 troops to the U.S.–Mexico border, and requesting a briefing and written justification from the U.S. Northern Command for troop deployment, while urging Mattis to "curb the unprecedented escalation of DOD involvement in immigration enforcement."

In January 2019, Harris was one of 20 senators to sponsor the Dreamer Confidentiality Act, a bill imposing a ban on the Department of Homeland Security (DHS) from passing information collected on DACA recipients to Immigration and Customs Enforcement (ICE), Customs and Border Protection (CBP), the Department of Justice, or any other law enforcement agency with exceptions in the case of fraudulent claims, national security issues, or non-immigration related felonies being investigated.

In April 2019, Harris signed a letter led by Catherine Cortez Masto to Immigrations and Customs Enforcement and Customs and Border Enforcement asserting that "the civil detention of an expectant mother for potential immigration offenses is never justified" due to the "absence of compelling evidence that the detention of a pregnant woman is necessary because she is a threat to herself or others, or is a threat to public safety or national security". The senators requested the CBP enact measures that would ensure "timely and appropriate treatment" for pregnant women in custody along with both agencies providing information on how available facilities and doctors are for pregnant immigrants and complete data on the number of those currently in custody.

In June 2019, during a forum at the University of Nevada, Las Vegas, Harris stated that as president she would push for comprehensive immigration reform in response to a stagnant Congress and outlined her immigration plan which included renewal and expansion of DACA, allowing undocumented parents, siblings, and spouses of U.S. citizens or lawful permanent residents to seek deportation relief, and using executive actions to undo technical barriers that prevent many Dreamers from receiving legal status by applying for a green card.

In June 2019, following the U.S. Department of Housing and Urban Development’s confirmation that DACA recipients did not meet eligibility for federal backed loans, Harris and 11 other senators introduced The Home Ownership Dreamers Act, legislation that mandated that the federal government was not authorized to deny mortgage loans backed by the Federal Housing Administration, Fannie Mae, Freddie Mac, or the Agriculture Department solely due to the immigration status of an applicant.

In July 2019, along with Kirsten Gillibrand and Amy Klobuchar, Harris sent a letter to the Office of Refugee Resettlement, asserting that the agency "should be prioritizing re-unification of every child as soon as possible, but instead, it has been responsible for policies that are forcing longer stays in government custody for children", and that it was mandatory that the office "ensure that the custody and processing of [unaccompanied migrant children] is meeting the minimum standards required by domestic and international law".

In July 2019, Harris and 15 other Senate Democrats introduced the Protecting Sensitive Locations Act which mandated that ICE agents get approval from a supervisor ahead of engaging in enforcement actions at sensitive locations with the exception of special circumstances and that agents receive annual training in addition to being required to report annually regarding enforcement actions in those locations.

In August 2019, after the Trump administration released a new regulation imposing the possibility that any green card and visa applicants could be turned down in the event that they have low incomes or little education and have used benefits such as food stamps and housing vouchers, Harris referred to the regulation as part of Trump's ongoing campaign "to vilify a whole group of people" and cited Trump's sending of service members to the southern border and building a border wall as part of his goal to distract "from the fact that he has betrayed so many people and has actually done very little that has been productive in the best interest of American families."

In November 2019, in response to reports from NBC News that ICE had put thousands of immigrants in solitary confinement between 2012 and 2017, despite some not violating the rules, Harris, Cory Booker, and Dick Durbin introduced legislation to prevent ICE from overusing solitary confinement in its facilities. Harris said the bill required "ICE to comply with specific safeguards to ensure individuals are treated more humanely and ICE is not adding to the trauma many of these people have already been subjected to".

In April 2020, Harris was a co-sponsor of the Coronavirus Immigrant Families Protection Act, legislation which would provide dedicated funding for the Centers for Disease Control and Prevention in its efforts for public outreach in multiple languages to hard-to-reach populations to ensure vulnerable communities are granted access to COVID-19 relief measures as well as critical public health information. The bill would also modify immigration policies deterring immigrants from receiving medical care relating to COVID-19.

In April 2020, Harris, along with fellow California Senator Dianne Feinstein and Representative Juan Vargas, sent a letter to the Department of Homeland Security Office of the Inspector General requesting an investigation into the way detainees were treated at the Otay Mesa Detention Center following reports that they were required to sign contracts to receive masks, citing that they were "in a public health crisis, and it is our duty to protect the health and safety of every individual, especially those who are in custody and unable to take precautions on their own."

Internet privacy and net neutrality
In September 2017, Harris was one of nine senators to sign a letter to Federal Communications Commission chairman Ajit Pai that charged the FCC with failing "to provide stakeholders with an opportunity to comment on the tens of thousands of filed complaints that directly shed light on proposed changes to existing net neutrality protections."

In March 2018, Harris was one of 10 senators to sign a letter spearheaded by Jeff Merkley lambasting Pai's proposal to curb the scope of benefits from the Lifeline program during a period where roughly 6.5 million people in poor communities relied on Lifeline to receive access to high-speed Internet, citing that it was Pai's "obligation to the American public, as the Chairman of the Federal Communications Commission, to improve the Lifeline program and ensure that more Americans can afford access, and have means of access, to broadband and phone service." The senators also advocated for insuring "Lifeline reaches more Americans in need of access to communication services."

LGBT rights 
As a member of the U.S. Senate, she co-sponsored the Equality Act.

In July 2018, Harris led her colleagues in introducing the Gay and Trans Panic Defense Prohibition Act of 2018, a nationwide bill that would curtail the effectiveness of the so-called gay and trans panic defenses, an issue she pioneered during her tenure as District Attorney of San Francisco.

In October 2019, Harris participated in a CNN/Human Rights Campaign town hall on the topic of LGBTQ rights, where she pledged her support for "all of the folks who are fighting for equality" in cases that would determine whether gay and transgender people were protected under laws banning federal workplace discrimination. Kamala Harris drew attention to the epidemic of hate crimes committed against Black trans women (at the time 20 killed that year), noting that LGBTQ people of color are doubly exposed to discrimination.

Sex workers
As district attorney in 2008, Harris opposed Prop K, a San Francisco ballot measure to decriminalize sex work, calling it "completely ridiculous." As attorney general, she led the charge against Backpage, an online classifieds service that had a subsection for escorts. In 2016, Harris filed charges against the site, leading to the arrest of the CEO and the removal of its adult section. Sex workers, who used the site to vet potential clients, were faced with a loss of income from the closure. Some were also forced into street prostitution, endangering their lives. Sex Workers Outreach Project executive director Kristen DiAngelo said that taking down Backpage would result in increased violence and risk to people engaged in survival sex. Harris also co-sponsored the Stop Enabling Sex Traffickers Act (SESTA), an anti-sex trafficking law, which holds websites responsible for third-party ads. Surveys have indicated that SESTA resulted in an overall rise in violence against sex workers.

In a 2019 interview with The Root, Harris indicated that her position on sex work had relaxed. Asked if she supported the decriminalization of sex work, Harris said "I think so. I do." She then said she had prioritized arresting pimps and johns over sex workers. According to Rolling Stone, her comments were viewed as support for partial decriminalization, akin to the Nordic approach to sex work.

Women's rights
In September 2016, Governor Jerry Brown signed Assembly Bill 1671 into law, which was reportedly drafted by Harris, with input from Planned Parenthoodwhich sponsored the billmaking it a criminal offense to intentionally distribute, or to help with the dissemination of, unlawfully obtained confidential communications.

Since her election to the Senate, Harris has maintained a 100% rating by the abortion rights advocacy group, Planned Parenthood Action Fund, and a 0% rating by the anti-abortion group, National Right to Life Committee. She was also endorsed by Emily's List in 2015 during her Senatorial Campaign.

Voting rights
Harris attributed the 2018 gubernatorial losses of Stacey Abrams and Andrew Gillum, in Georgia and Florida respectively, to voter suppression.

In 2020, along with House Whip Jim Clyburn and Marcia Fudge Harris introduced the Vote Safe Act, which sets forth uniform national standards for all registered voters to use mail-in absentee voting, a minimum early in-person voting period of 20 days, and $5 billion in funding and grants for states to increase the safety and availability of voting amidst the COVID-19 pandemic. The bill was endorsed by the ACLU.

Economic issues 

Harris identifies as a capitalist and rejects socialism, but insists that more needs to be done to ensure equal opportunities, particularly for working people.

Campaign finance
Harris's 2020 campaign has disavowed most corporate donations, and has committed to rejecting money from corporate political action committees for her presidential campaign, in favor of relying on small and large individual donors.

Harris, along with candidates Cory Booker, Julian Castro, Tulsi Gabbard, Kirsten Gillibrand, Amy Klobuchar, Bernie Sanders, Elizabeth Warren, and Marianne Williamson, has explicitly discouraged single-candidate super PACs from operating on her behalf, though she cannot prevent them from doing so.

COVID-19 
In April 2020, Harris, along with Adam Schiff and Dianne Feinstein, unveiled legislation that would establish a bi-partisan commission to review the U.S. response to the ongoing COVID-19 pandemic, similar to the 9/11 Commission and the Pearl Harbor Commission. Harris and her colleagues also sent a letter to the Trump administration's health officials demanding a consistent protocol for counting the number of casualties caused by the virus to prevent deflation and underreporting of the number of deaths.

Harris announced that she would be introducing legislation to create a task force that would address racial disparities, the COVID-19 Racial and Ethnic Disparities Task Force Act. Under the law, the U.S. Department of Health and Human Services would be empowered to make recommendations about effective distribution of resources to communities suffering from racial and ethnic disparities in COVID-19 infection, hospitalization, and death rates. House Rep. Robin Kelly introduced a companion bill in the lower chamber.

Alongside Senator Kirsten Gillibrand, Harris introduced a bill that would expand access by 30 percent to the Supplemental Nutrition Assistance Program, commonly known as food stamps. Harris also introduced a bi-partisan bill with Republican Senator Tim Scott, with the support of chef José Andrés to expand eligibility for assistance from FEMA, allowing state and local governments to partner with restaurants and non-profit groups to feed those in need during the pandemic. Harris also introduced a bill with and Senators Bernie Sanders and Ed Markey to give Americans a monthly payment of $2000 during the coronavirus crisis, with payments to every U.S. resident making up to $120,000 as the unemployment rate spiked to 14.7%.

Disaster relief 
In October 2017, following Hurricane Maria and Hurricane Irma, Harris signed a letter to Acting Secretary of Homeland Security Elaine Duke urging her "to provide all necessary resources to confirm that storm-related deaths are being counted correctly" given that President Trump seemed "to be using the number of fatalities to determine the quality of the disaster response".

In August 2018, Harris was one of eight senators to sign a letter to the Federal Emergency Management Agency charging the agency with not assisting displaced homeowners in Puerto Rico in the aftermath of Hurricane Maria under the Individuals and Households program (IHP) at "alarming rates".

In February 2019, Harris introduced the Protecting Disaster Relief Funds Act, a bill that would prevent Trump from taking funds allocated to the Departments of Homeland Security and Housing and Urban Development or the Army Corps of Engineers for disaster relief and using the funds in construction of physical barriers along the U.S.-Mexico border. Harris said the bill would "ensure that funds intended for victims of natural disasters do not go towards a wall that Congress won't fund and people on the border don't even want" and "stand up for Congress's power of the purse and help California families affected by recent natural disasters begin the process of recovery."

In March 2019, Harris was one of 11 senators to sign a letter to congressional leaders urging them to "bring legislation providing disaster supplemental appropriations to your respective floors for consideration immediately" after noting that the previous year had seen 124 federal disaster declarations approved for states, territories, and tribal nations across the US.

In April 2019, Harris announced her opposition to a Republican disaster aid package, charging the Trump administration with playing "politics with disaster funding by failing to fully assist California wildfire victims and the millions of American citizens still struggling in Puerto Rico and the U.S. Virgin Islands. Survivors of these disasters are hurting, and they deserve immediate and meaningful support—this bill does not do that."

In November 2019, wildfire conditions forced California power companies to begin presumptive public safety power shutoff events, nearly 800,000 electric customers were left without electricity for days. People in areas particularly vulnerable to the fires were left vulnerable, without any way of getting information and supplies. Harris introduced the Wildfire Defense Act, a bill which would invest $1 billion to establish guidelines to create community wildfire defense plans, provide grants of up to $10 million to implement such a plan, and create reporting on best practices to protect communities from wildfires. Her bill was co-sponsored by House Representative Jared Huffman.

Consumer protection
On April 10, 2020, Harris and Senator Elizabeth Warren introduced the Price Gouging Prevention Act, a bill that would empower the Federal Trade Commission to enforce a ban on excessive price increases of consumer goods amid national emergencies and specifically consider any price increase above 10% to be price gouging during such a declaration.

In April 2020, Harris, along with Senator Sherrod Brown and Representatives Ayanna Pressley and Gregory Meeks, sent a letter to the Small Business Administration and Treasury Department requesting that the aforementioned agencies move to ensure minority-owned businesses remain under the Paycheck Protection Program and called for the Trump administration revise guidance on the program to reaffirm lending institutions comply with fair lending laws and mandate that they report the demographics of program lending.

Energy and environment

During her time as San Francisco District Attorney, Harris created the Environmental Justice Unit in the San Francisco District Attorney's Office and prosecuted several industries and individuals for pollution, most notably U-Haul, Alameda Publishing Corporation, and the Cosco Busan oil spill. She also advocated for strong enforcement of environmental protection laws.

In October 2017, Harris was one of 19 senators to sign a letter to Administrator of the Environmental Protection Agency Scott Pruitt questioning Pruitt's decision to repeal the Clean Power Plan, asserting that the repeal's proposal used "mathematical sleights of hand to over-state the costs of industry compliance with the 2015 Rule and understate the benefits that will be lost if the 2017 repeal is finalized" and science denying and math fabricating would fail to "satisfy the requirements of the law, nor will it slow the increase in frequency and intensity of extreme weather events, the inexorable rise in sea levels, or the other dire effects of global warming that our planet is already experiencing."

In September 2018, Harris was one of eight senators to sponsor the Climate Risk Disclosure Act, a bill described by co-sponsor Elizabeth Warren as using "market forces to speed up the transition from fossil fuels to cleaner energy—reducing the odds of an environmental and financial disaster without spending a dime of taxpayer money." She stated that her goal would be achieving 100% of U.S. electricity from renewable energy sources, and that she supports a Green New Deal, an idea made popular by first-term Congresswoman Alexandria Ocasio-Cortez, because "climate change is an existential threat to all of us."

In November 2018, Harris was one of 25 Democratic senators to co-sponsor a resolution specifying key findings of the Intergovernmental Panel On Climate Change report and National Climate Assessment. The resolution affirmed the senators' acceptance of the findings and their support for bold action toward addressing climate change.

On July 29, 2019, Harris and Ocasio-Cortez introduced the Climate Equity Act, a bill that would lay out steps for Congress and the White House on how to go about guaranteeing policies that composed "a future Green New Deal protect the health and economic wellbeing of all Americans for generations to come." Referring to climate change as "an existential threat", Harris noted cutting emissions and ending American reliance on fossil fuels were not enough and cited the need "that communities already contending with unsafe drinking water, toxic air, and lack of economic opportunity are not left behind."

In August 2019, Harris was one of fifteen senators to sign a letter to EPA Administrator Andrew Wheeler urging the EPA to ban chlorpyrifos given that the agency had found "that chlorpyrifos harms children's brains at exposures far lower than what the EPA allows" and warned that "more children, farmworkers and American families will be exposed to this pesticide and they will suffer as a result" of the EPA not reversing its decision.

On September 4, 2019, Harris unveiled a $10 trillion climate change plan intended to move the United States to a 100 percent renewable energy-based power grid by 2030 in addition to transitioning all vehicles in America to the same energy sources by 2035. She pledged to rejoin the Paris Agreement and end U.S. support for international oil and natural gas extraction projects, furthering that as president she would "hold polluters accountable for the damage they inflict upon our environment and set us on a path to a 100 percent clean economy that creates millions of good-paying jobs."

In February 2020 Harris was one of seven senators to sign a letter to Secretary of the Interior David Bernhardt that called it "reckless and unwise" to remove protections to the Arctic after the U.S. Geological Survey found the Arctic to be warming faster than any other place on Earth and stating their support for "the strongest possible protections" for Special Areas within the National Petroleum Reserve-Alaska.

In April 2020, in response to the proposed decision of the EPA to retain air quality standards from the Obama administration, Harris was one of 18 senators to sign a letter led by fellow Democratic senator Maggie Hassan asserting that the EPA "should be taking actions that will further protect health during this crisis, not put more Americans at risk."

Free trade 
In May 2019, Harris stated she would not have voted for the North American Free Trade Agreement (NAFTA) due to her belief that "we can do a better job to protect American workers" and called for the United States to do "a better job in terms of thinking about the priorities that should be more apparent now than perhaps they were then, which are issues like the climate crisis and what we need to build into these trade agreements."

In September 2019, Harris declared she was not a "protectionist Democrat".

In January 2020, she was one of ten senators to vote against the USMCA, stating that "by not confronting climate change, the USMCA fails to meet the crises of the moment".

Healthcare 

On August 30, 2017, Harris announced at a town hall in Oakland that she would co-sponsor fellow Senator Bernie Sanders' "Medicare for All" bill, supporting single-payer healthcare.

In April 2018, Harris was one of ten senators to sponsor the Choose Medicare Act, an expanded public option for health insurance that also increased ObamaCare subsidies and rendered individuals with higher income levels eligible for its assistance.

In August 2018, Harris introduced the Maternal Care Access and Reducing Emergencies (CARE) Act, a bill designed to reduce racial disparities in maternal mortality and morbidity. In the United States, the risk of death from pregnancy-related causes for Black women is three to four times higher than for white women, and Black women are twice as likely to suffer from life-threatening pregnancy complications. She was joined by 13 of her Democratic colleagues.

In December 2018, Harris was one of 42 senators to sign a letter to Trump administration officials Alex Azar, Seema Verma, and Steve Mnuchin, arguing that the administration was improperly using Section 1332 of the Affordable Care Act to authorize states to "increase health care costs for millions of consumers, while weakening protections for individuals with pre-existing conditions". The senators requested the administration withdraw the policy and "re-engage with stakeholders, states, and Congress".

In February 2019, Harris and 22 other Democratic senators introduced the State Public Option Act, a bill that would authorize states to form a Medicaid buy-in program for all residents and thereby grant all denizens of the state the ability to buy into a state-driven Medicaid health insurance plan if they wished. Brian Schatz, a bill co-sponsor, said the legislation would "unlock each state's Medicaid program to anyone who wants it, giving people a high-quality, low-cost public health insurance option" and that its goal was "to make sure that every single American has comprehensive health care coverage."

In June 2019, Harris was one of eight senators to co-sponsor the Territories Health Equity Act of 2019, legislation that would remove the cap on annual federal Medicaid funding and increase federal matching rate for Medicaid expenditures of territories along with more funds being provided for prescription drug coverage to low-income seniors in an attempt to equalize funding for American territories Puerto Rico, the Virgin Islands, Guam, American Samoa and the Northern Mariana Islands with that of U.S. states.

On July 29, 2019, Harris unveiled a health plan that would expand coverage while preserving a role for private insurance companies, the plan calling for transitioning to a Medicare for All system over a period of 10 years that would be concurrent with infants and the uninsured automatically being placed into the system while other individuals would have the option to buy into the health care plan backed by the government. The plan has been met with some criticism from both Democrats and Republicans.

In November 2019, during a Morning Joe interview, Harris declined to specify the inconsistencies in the Medicare For All plan of fellow senator and 2020 Democratic presidential candidate Elizabeth Warren, saying that her own plan was superior and that she was "not going to take away people's choice about having a public or a private plan, I am going to give people a transition that allows folks like organized labor to actually renegotiate their contract."

In April 2020, Harris was one of 28 Democratic senators to sign a letter to the United States Department of Health and Human Services urging the department to reopen the online marketplace of the Affordable Care Act as to assist uninsured Americans with acquiring health insurance amid the COVID-19 pandemic, opining that opening the marketplace "would provide an easy pathway to coverage for those who under previous circumstances may have decided to forego health insurance or purchase a substandard, junk insurance plan, but now in a global pandemic are in vital need of comprehensive coverage to protect themselves, their families, and our broader community."

In April 2020, Harris was one of twenty senators to sign a letter to United States Secretary of Health and Human Services Alex Azar regarding the removal of Dr. Rick Bright as Director of the Research and Development Authority. The senators asserted that it was of "the utmost importance that there be stable leadership within HHS and that decisions are driven by science and the public health" during the coronavirus pandemic and warned that the US could not have a steady response if its leadership was "being constantly shuffled and if experts are being constrained or removed when they insist on following the science and sticking to the facts."

Housing 
In April 2019 Harris was one of 41 senators to sign a bi-partisan letter to the housing subcommittee praising the United States Department of Housing and Urban Development's Section 4 Capacity Building program as authorizing "HUD to partner with national nonprofit community development organizations to provide education, training, and financial support to local community development corporations (CDCs) across the country" and expressing disappointment that Trump's budget "has slated this program for elimination after decades of successful economic and community development". The senators wrote that they hoped the subcommittee would support continued funding for Section 4 in Fiscal Year 2020.

In November 2019, Harris and Representative Maxine Waters introduced the Housing is Infrastructure Act, a bill that would grant $70 billion toward clearing a backlog of repairs and upgrades to federal subsidized housing and apply 25 billion toward grants for affordable housing construction and maintenance in communities of low-income as well as Native American reservations, disaffected rural areas and vulnerable groups such as the elderly and disabled.

Labor unions
In final weeks leading up to the 2010 California Attorney General election, union groups such as California Labor Federation, Service Employees International Union Local 1000 and the California Nurses Association "spent hundreds of thousands of dollars" in an attempt to help Harris defeat Republican Steve Cooley.

In May 2018, Harris was a co-sponsor of the Workplace Democracy Act, a bill introduced by Representatives Donald Norcross, Mark Pocan and Rosa DeLauro and Senator Bernie Sanders intended to ease the rights of workers in their attempts to bargain for higher wages, benefits, or superior working conditions. It included a mandate that there must be a union for workers when a majority of them in a bargaining unit sign valid authorization cards to join a union and prevent employers from exploiting workers through mischaracterizing them as independent contractors or denying them overtime.

In June 2018, Harris led seven other senators in sponsoring a bill amending the Fair Labor Standards Act of 1938 to include a mandate forcing farmers to pay workers time and a half for each hour worked past the standard 40-hour work week. Harris asserted that the bill would aim "to correct some of the injustices they face and guarantee they will get paid for the hours they work including overtime, and minimum wage which right now they are not entitled to by law."

In April 2019, Harris delivered a speech at a labor dinner honoring state legislators in Sacramento, California where she listed workers benefits that would not have been made possible without organized labor and condemned rhetoric that described unions as "special-interest groups."

In July 2019, Harris and Representative Pramila Jayapal introduced the Domestic Worker's Bill of Rights in Congress. The bill included protections against harassment and discrimination in addition to guarantees for meal breaks, a minimum wage, and pay for working overtime. Harris stated that for too long American workers had "not been afforded the same rights and benefits as nearly every other worker, and we must change that" and that the bill was "an opportunity to bring economic justice and empowerment to millions of domestic workers—particularly those who are immigrants and women of color."

In July 2019, Harris signed a letter to United States Secretary of Labor Alexander Acosta that advocated for the U.S. Occupational Safety and Health Administration to initiate a full investigation into a complaint filed on May 20 by a group of Chicago-area employees of McDonald's, which detailed workplace violence incidents that included interactions with customers such as customers throwing hot coffee and threatening employees with firearms and more. The senators argued that McDonald's could and needed to "do more to protect its employees, but employers will not take seriously their obligations to provide a safe workplace if OSHA does not enforce workers rights to a hazard-free workplace."

In August 2019, Harris delivered a speech at the Nevada State AFL-CIO Convention asserting that workers were benefitting from the American economy, and that the United States would be stronger if it invested in the American worker.

In August 2019, a bill that which would mandate a California Supreme Court ruling that deems a greater share of workers to be employees as opposed to independent contractors be made law was seen as "setting up a clash between organized labor and prominent California companies like Uber and Postmates." Ian Sams, a spokesperson for Harris' then-ongoing presidential campaign, said the latter supported the bill due to her belief that "we need to go even further to bolster worker protections and benefits and elevate the voice of workers" and added that Harris wanted all workers to have a "robust social safety net" and the right to join a union.

Paid leave 

On October 7, 2019, Harris unveiled a six months paid family and medical leave plan that included forming a new Office of Paid Family and Medical Leave that would oversee, determine eligibility and authorize benefit payments. Harris's paid leave program would be funded through general revenue and payroll contributions and establish a federal Bureau of Children and Family Justice. In a statement, Harris said the US will be brought "closer to economic justice for workers and ensures newborn children or children who are sick can get the care they need from a parent without thrusting the family into upheaval" via a six-month paid leave guarantee.

Small business
In May 2020, Harris introduced a bill with Ayanna Pressley, which would allocate grants of up to $250,000 to businesses with fewer than 10 employees, providing relief to "micro businesses" shut out of the larger coronavirus relief bill. Under the Saving Our Street Act, 75% of the $124.5 billion program would go to business and nonprofit owners from underrepresented groups and businesses bringing in less than $1 million in gross revenue per year.

Taxes 
Harris opposed the Tax Cuts and Jobs Act of 2017, and has called for a repeal of the bill's tax cuts for wealthy Americans. In 2018, she proposed a tax cut for the majority of working- and middle-class Americans. An analysis by the nonpartisan Tax Policy Center estimated that the bill would reduce federal revenue by $2.8 trillion over a decade. She proposed to pay for the tax cuts by repealing tax cuts for wealthy Americans and by increasing taxes on corporations.

In April 2020, during the COVID-19 pandemic, Harris was a co-sponsor of the All Dependents Count Act, legislation that expand eligibility for the $500 credit under the CARES Act for a taxpayer to receive a $500 credit for all dependents they care for.

United States Postal Service 
In March 2019, Harris was a co-sponsor of a bi-partisan resolution led by Gary Peters and Jerry Moran that opposed privatization of the United States Postal Service (USPS), citing the USPS as an establishment that was self-sustained and noting concerns that a potential privatization could cause higher prices and reduced services for customers of USPS with a particular occurrence in rural communities.

In April 2020, Harris was one of fourteen senators to sign a letter led by Cory Booker to Senate Majority Leader Mitch McConnell and Senate Minority Leader Chuck Schumer urging them "to provide appropriate funding to the United States Postal Service (USPS) in the next coronavirus package that Congress takes up" as they reasoned that millions of Americans rely on the USPS for essential goods and duties.

Workplace harassment 
In March 2019, Harris and Republican Senator Lisa Murkowski re-introduced the Ending the Monopoly of Power Over Workplace Harassment through Education and Reporting (EMPOWER) Act, a bill that would prohibit non-disclosure and non-disparagement clauses used by some employers in employment requirements.

In April 2019, Harris signed onto the Be HEARD Act, legislation intended to abolish the tipped minimum wage along with ending mandatory arbitration and pre-employment nondisclosure agreements. The bill also gave workers additional time to report harassment and was said by co-sponsor Patty Murray to come at a time when too many workers are "still silenced by mandatory disclosure agreements that prevent them from discussing sexual harassment and long-standing practices like the tipped wages that keep workers in certain industries especially vulnerable".

Foreign policy

Presidential war powers 
In September 2019, The New York Times issued a questionnaire, including the question, "Under what circumstances other than a literally imminent threat to the United States, if any, does the Constitution permit a president to order an attack on another country without prior Congressional authorization? What about bombing Iranian or North Korean nuclear facilities?". Harris answered: "The President's top priority is to keep America secure, and I won't hesitate to do what it takes to protect our country in the face of an imminent threat in the future. But after almost two decades of war, it is long past time for Congress to re-write the Authorization for Use of Military Force that governs our current military conflicts. The situations in Iran or North Korea would require careful consideration of all of the surrounding facts and circumstances."

Asia

China

Harris has sharply criticized President Trump's trade war with China, describing the administration's arbitrary use of tariffs as "counter-productive to its goal of ensuring a level playing field for American companies".

Harris has also condemned the Chinese government's "abysmal human rights record", emphasizing the mass detention of Uyghur Muslims in the Xinjiang internment camps and mass surveillance in China for political and religious repression. Harris added that while cooperation with the Chinese may be necessary for global issues like climate change, the United States must reclaim its moral authority to stand up forcefully for human rights in China. Harris has expressed her support for the protestors in Hong Kong, co-sponsoring the Hong Kong Human Rights and Democracy Act in October 2019.

She condemned the Hong Kong government's "excessive use of force" and "failure to respect the rights and autonomy of Hong Kong’s people", as well as criticizing the Trump administration as having "turned a blind eye".

India
Kamala Harris has taken stances on Indian legislation such as the Citizenship Act, as well as legislation affecting Kashmir, which the Indian government considers sovereign matters. Within weeks of India ending the special status of Kashmir on August 5, 2019, Harris, along with other leaders of the Democratic Party, met members of the Kashmiri diaspora represented by the non-governmental organization Justice For Kashmir (JFK). According to media reports, the aim of JFK is to raise awareness on "political incursions" by India in Kashmir among the leading politicians, bureaucrats, and intellectuals in the US. These meetings were arranged by Asif Mahmood, a Pakistani doctor who was at the time running for lieutenant governor of California.

A few months later, in December 2019, Harris criticized India's foreign minister, Subrahmanyam Jaishankar, for refusing to attend a meeting with Congressional delegates because the delegation included Pramila Jayapal, who had introduced a resolution on Kashmir urging India to lift restrictions. New Delhi had described the resolution as not being a "fair characteristic of what the government of India is doing".

During her unsuccessful presidential campaign, when Harris was asked about the lockdown in Kashmir, she said, "It is about reminding people that they are not alone, that we are all watching," leaving little doubt as to her stance.

Myanmar
In October 2017, Harris condemned the genocide of the Rohingya Muslim minority in Myanmar and called for a stronger response to the crisis.

North Korea

Serving on the Select Committee on Intelligence, Harris has characterized North Korea as "one of the most serious security threats". In February 2018, Harris was one of 18 Democratic senators to sign a letter to President Donald Trump stating that he lacked the authority to launch a preemptive strike against North Korea without authorization from Congress. The letter stated: "Without congressional authority, a preventative or preemptive U.S. military strike would lack either a constitutional basis or legal authority."

In February 2019, after former Acting FBI Director Andrew McCabe claimed that Trump believed the claims of President of Russia Vladimir Putin over U.S. intelligence agencies' reports on the subject of North Korea's missile capabilities, she told reporters, "The idea that the president of the U.S. would take the word of the head of Russia over the intel community is the height of irresponsibility and shameful." Later that month, the 2019 North Korea–United States Hanoi Summit scheduled for February 27 and 28 at the Sofitel Legend Metropole Hanoi in Hanoi, Vietnam, was cut short without an agreement after the White House claimed North Korea purportedly requested an end to all sanctions, though North Korean Foreign Minister Ri Yong-ho later claimed the regime was only interested in a partial lifting of sanctions.

In May 2019 on an appearance on CNN, Harris condemned Trump's relationship with the North Korean dictator Kim Jong-un. Following the failure of the Hanoi summit and after a North Korean ship was seized in defiance of international sanctions, Pyongyang conducted missile tests in retaliation, Harris stated that embracing Kim and not confronting the regime's human rights violations was "not in the best interests of the nation."

In an August 2019 interview, Harris emphasized that any diplomatic solution with respect to North Korea must involve American allies Japan and the Republic of Korea. When asked if she as president would sign an agreement with North Korea granting partial sanctions relief in exchange for some denuclearization, Harris replied that Trump had given "Kim one PR victory after the next, all without securing any real concessions" and that she would "consider targeted sanctions relief to improve the lives of the North Korean people if the regime were to take serious, verifiable steps to roll back its nuclear program."

During the November 2019 Democratic presidential debate, Harris was asked whether she would make concessions to Kim Jong-un to continue the talks started by the Trump administration. Harris responded that Trump had been "punked" and that he had compromised America's ability to slow down North Korea's nuclear program. Harris pointed out that by ending military exercises with South Korea, there were no more concessions to be made, adding that Trump "traded a photo-op for nothing".

Central and South America

El Salvador, Guatemala, and Honduras

In April and July 2019, Harris was one of 34 senators to sign a letter to Trump encouraging him "to listen to members of your own Administration" and reverse a decision to cut off $370 million in foreign assistance to El Salvador, Guatemala, and Honduras. The senators argued that foreign assistance to Central American countries created less migration to the U.S., citing the funding's helping to improve conditions in those countries.

Brazil
In 2019, as the 2019 Amazon rainforest wildfires began intensifying in Brazil, Bolivia, Paraguay, and Peru, as a result of slash-and-burn deforestation and the effects of climate change, Harris called out Brazilian President Jair Bolsonaro for his failure to act. She later joined her Senate colleagues in urging U.S. Trade Representative Robert Lighthizer to postpone trade negotiations with Brazil until he took steps to combat the illegal deforestation.

Venezuela
In early 2019, an ongoing Venezuelan presidential crisis regarding the legitimacy of the President of Venezuela erupted between factions supporting incumbent Nicolás Maduro and challenger Juan Guaidó. The opposition-majority National Assembly declared Maduro a "usurper" and announced its intentions to proceed with Guaidó as the acting president under Article 233 of the Venezuelan Constitution while the Supreme Tribunal of Justice declared the National Assembly to be "unconstitutional." Protests erupted and international condemnation of Maduro followed thereafter, with Guaidó being recognized as the acting President of Venezuela by about 60 countries. Recognition of the Maduro government fell along traditional geopolitical lines, with the governments of China, Cuba, Iran, North Korea, Russia, and Turkey supporting Maduro. Juan Guaidó has promised to allow U.S. oil companies to increase their activity in Venezuela, in the context of liaisons between the Trump administration and Guaido such as Senator Marco Rubio claiming that Guaidó would create jobs refining heavy crude for American workers.

In response, Harris condemned Maduro as a repressive and corrupt dictator, calling on the Venezuelan military not to exercise use of force against civilians. Harris committed to extending temporary protected status to Venezuelans living in America to prevent their deportation back to South America. She did not support military action by U.S. forces, criticizing John Bolton's suggestions to adopt a more hawkish position, suggesting dispersal of additional aid to humanitarian organizations working in Venezuela.

Europe

NATO

In July 2018, Harris, ahead of an Exercise RIMPAC, the world's largest international maritime warfare exercise between the military forces from the Pacific Rim and beyond, expressed gratitude to the member nations of NATO. She stated that Trump's "disgusting" criticism of Canada, Germany, and other NATO countries had "frayed" the alliance, but that "long-time mutual trust surpasses whatever happens in the White House".

Russia
In June 2017, Harris spoke out against Russia's interference in the 2016 elections, calling out their exploitation of divisive issues on race and joining the intelligence community's unanimous assessment that the Russians assisted Donald Trump's campaign. In July 2017, Harris voted in favor of the Countering America's Adversaries Through Sanctions Act that grouped together sanctions against Iran, Russia and North Korea.

Harris has condemned the Annexation of Crimea by the Russian Federation, calling it a "severe violation of the international norms that have guided the world since World War II". She also referred to the downing of Malaysia Airlines Flight 17 as an act of Russian aggression, attributing responsibility of the 298 civilians on board to a Russian surface-to-air missile. She expressed her support for the sovereignty of Ukraine, and led her colleagues in holding the Trump administration accountable on the issue by filing a Freedom of Information Act lawsuit, in hopes of releasing documents related to the Trump–Ukraine scandal that led to the initiation of the President's impeachment process, which eventually failed to proceed and concluded with the President's acquittal.

In December 2018, after Secretary of State Mike Pompeo announced the Trump administration was suspending its obligations in the Intermediate-Range Nuclear Forces Treaty in 60 days in the event that Russia continued to violate the treaty, Harris was one of 26 senators to sign a letter expressing concern over the administration "now abandoning generations of bi-partisan U.S. leadership around the paired goals of reducing the global role and number of nuclear weapons and ensuring strategic stability with America's nuclear-armed adversaries" and calling on Trump to continue arms negotiations.

Middle East

Afghanistan
In December 2018, Harris traveled to Kabul, Mazar-e Sharif, and Kandahar in Afghanistan with two of her Republican colleagues on the Senate Intelligence Committee, Senators Burr and Lankford to visit troops, diplomats, and other national security professionals. Harris, joining her colleagues, has said the War in Afghanistan must end, albeit responsibly and in coordination with regional allies to protect gains made for Afghan women and others.

Israel
In 2017, Harris gave a public address to AIPAC attendees. She said: "I believe Israel should never be a partisan issue, and as long as I'm a United States senator, I will do everything in my power to ensure broad and bi-partisan support for Israel's security and right to self-defense." Harris noted that "the first resolution I co-sponsored as a United States senator was to combat anti-Israel bias at the United Nations", referring to a Senate resolution celebrating the 50th anniversary of the re-unification of Jerusalem. In that same speech, she expressed her support for a two-state solution to the Israeli–Palestinian conflict.

In late 2017, she traveled to Israel, where she met with Israeli Prime Minister Benjamin Netanyahu and visited the Western Wall, Yad Vashem, and the Supreme Court of Israel. Executive Director of the Jewish Democratic Council of America Halie Soifer, who previously served as Harris's national security advisor, said the following of Harris:

In 2018, in another speech to AIPAC, Harris reiterated her support for Israel, reminiscing about growing up in the Bay Area, collecting funds to plant trees in Israel for the Jewish National Fund. She later condemned anti-Semitism in the aftermath of Tree of Life – Or L'Simcha Congregation shooting which claimed the lives of 11 worshippers during Shabbat morning services.

In 2019, she opposed the Boycott, Divestment, and Sanctions movement targeting Israel. She was a co-sponsor of a Senate resolution expressing objection to the UN Security Council Resolution 2334, which condemned Israeli settlement building in the West Bank as a violation of international law.

Iran
Harris supported the Joint Comprehensive Plan of Action, also known as the Iran nuclear deal. In 2018, after Trump announced the United States was withdrawing from the treaty, Harris released a statement saying the decision "jeopardizes our national security and isolates us from our closest allies" while calling the Joint Comprehensive Plan of Action "the best existing tool we have to prevent Iran from developing nuclear weapons and avoid a disastrous military conflict in the Middle East." In 2019, Harris said she would rejoin the agreement and expand it to cover ballistic missile testing.

In the wake of the assassination of Qasem Soleimani, the commander of the Iranian Quds Force, Harris joined her Senate colleagues in introducing the No War Against Iran Act and condemning Trump's "dangerous escalation" with the Iranian regime.

Saudi Arabia
In late 2018, she voted to withdraw U.S. military aid for Saudi Arabia's war in Yemen. She also backed a resolution blaming Saudi Crown Prince Mohammad bin Salman for the murder of dissident journalist Jamal Khashoggi in the Saudi Arabian consulate in Istanbul. Harris also said that Trump had turned a blind eye to the murder. She has called for a "fundamental" re-evaluation of the American relationship with Saudi Arabia, but acknowledged that the Saudis have been strong partners in areas of mutual interest, such as counterterrorism.

Syria
In April 2017, in response to the Khan Shaykhun chemical attack, Harris condemned Syrian president Bashar al-Assad with attacking Syrian children, and stated "the clear fact that president Assad is not only a ruthless dictator brutalizing his own people—he is a war criminal the international community cannot ignore." She called on President Trump to work with Congress on his administration's "lack of clear objectives in Syria and articulate a detailed strategy and path forward in partnership with our allies." Later that month, in her first overseas trip as a senator, she visited the Zaatari refugee camp in Jordan, the world's largest camp for Syrian refugees.

In May 2017, the Trump administration decided to arm Kurds in Syria in the fight against ISIS over the objections of Turkey. In November 2017, under pressure from Turkish President Recep Tayyip Erdogan, Trump reversed course and cut off the Kurds' supply of arms. Then, in December 2018, President Trump announced the full withdrawal of American troops in Syria, leading to the resignation of Defense Secretary Jim Mattis. Harris immediately criticized Trump's decision to withdraw U.S. troops from Syria, which gave Turkey the green light to launch the military offensive against Syrian Kurds.

In August 2019, after Hawaii congresswoman Tulsi Gabbard attacked Harris for her record as a prosecutor in a presidential debate, Harris characterized Gabbard as an "apologist" for al-Assad's regime. In November 2019, during a presidential debate, Harris condemned Gabbard for her decision to meet with al-Assad in 2017, her subsequent skepticism about claims that Assad used chemical weapons against civilians in Khan Shaykhun, and her refusal to call al-Assad a war criminal.

References 

Kamala Harris
Harris, Kamala
Harris, Kamala